Augustí Julbe Bosch (born 3 May 1972) is a Spanish basketball coach who currently serves as head coach for Al Ahly.

Coaching career
Born in Barcelona, Julbe started his coaching career with CB Cornellà as assistant in 1995.

In December 2020, Julbe signed with Egyptian club Zamalek for the 2020–21 season. He also led the team in the inaugural season of the Basketball Africa League (BAL), and led the team to the championship. As such, Julbe became the first coach ever to win the BAL title.

In the summer of 2021, Julbe became the head coach of Al Ahly. He won the double in Egypt, winning both the Cup and the Super League title.

References

1972 births
Living people
Spanish basketball coaches
Spanish expatriate sportspeople in Egypt
Zamalek SC basketball coaches
Al Ahly basketball coaches
Sportspeople from Barcelona
Baloncesto Fuenlabrada coaches
Basketball Africa League coaches